Fabian Juries (born 28 February 1979) is a South African former rugby union player.  Juries was the IRB Sevens World Series' third-highest ever try-scorer. He led the World Series in tries scored in 2004 and again in 2008. In 2008, he was nominated for the World Rugby Sevens Player of the Year award, but lost to New Zealand’s DJ Forbes.
After his playing career, Juries coached the Nigeria Black Stallions until 2016.

He currently works in Dubai for Apollo Perilini Rugby Skills Academy

References

External links 
 WP rugby profile
 

Living people
1979 births
South African rugby union players
Stormers players
Western Province (rugby union) players
Griquas (rugby union) players
Bulls (rugby union) players
Cheetahs (rugby union) players
Free State Cheetahs players
Rugby union fullbacks
Rugby union wings
People from Makhanda, Eastern Cape
South Africa international rugby sevens players
Rugby sevens players at the 2002 Commonwealth Games
Rugby sevens players at the 2006 Commonwealth Games
Commonwealth Games bronze medallists for South Africa
Commonwealth Games rugby sevens players of South Africa
Commonwealth Games medallists in rugby sevens
Male rugby sevens players
South African sportsmen
Alumni of Kingswood College (South Africa)
Medallists at the 2002 Commonwealth Games